NGC 4468 is a dwarf elliptical galaxy located about 55 million light-years away in the constellation of Coma Berenices. The galaxy was discovered by astronomer William Herschel on January 14, 1787. It is a member of the Virgo Cluster.

See also 
 List of NGC objects (4001–5000)

References

External links

Dwarf elliptical galaxies
Coma Berenices
4468
41171
7628
Astronomical objects discovered in 1787
Virgo Cluster